John D. Rockefeller 3rd College, or "Rocky", is one of six residential colleges at Princeton University, United States. It was founded in 1982, making it the third residential college to be established at Princeton. It is named for John D. Rockefeller 3rd, Princeton Class of 1929, who served as a major donor and longtime trustee of the University.

The college is located in the northwestern corner of the Princeton campus and is largely composed of Collegiate Gothic style structures.  Madison Hall, home of the college dining hall, office, and common spaces, and the dorms Holder Hall, Buyers Hall (formerly "East Blair Hall"), and part of Campbell Hall are presently part of Rockefeller College.  Witherspoon Hall, built in 1877, is the oldest building in the college, and is characteristically Richardsonian Romanesque, a style which predates the Collegiate Gothic.

The college is home to roughly 500 first years and sophomores and a small number of upperclassmen. The college staff is led by the head (a faculty member), and also includes a dean, a director of studies, a college administrator, a college secretary, and two graduate student assistant masters.  The current master of Rockefeller College is Clancy Rowley, Professor of Mechanical and Aerospace Engineering.  A council of current students also contributes to college life, organizing trips, study breaks, and other opportunities.

Beginning with the 2007–2008 school year, Rockefeller College has, along with Princeton's other residential colleges, catered to upperclassmen as well as underclassmen, with new programs and advising. However, the college houses no upperclassmen, with the exception of Residential College Advisors.  Rocky is a two-year college, paired with the four-year Mathey College, located nearby.  Rockyites who wish to live in a residential college past their sophomore year may move into one of the three four-year colleges, Whitman, Mathey, and Butler.  Since Rocky is paired with Mathey College, priority for housing in Mathey is given to students who spent their first two years living in Rocky or Mathey.  Therefore, although it is possible for a Rockyite to move into any of the three four-year colleges after sophomore year, it is most advantageous for him or her to move into Mathey.

Rockefeller College's common room, Holder Hall, and Blair Arch (which adjoins Buyers Hall but is technically a part of Mathey College) were all featured in the film A Beautiful Mind.

Personnel
Each of the six residential college have a Head, a Dean of the College, a Director of Studies, a Director of Student Life, a College Administrator and a College Secretary. These positions are currently as follows:

Head of College: Clancy Rowley
Dean of the College Justine Hernandez Levine
Director of Studies Maria Medvedeva
Director of Student Life Amy Ham Johnson
College Administrator Karen Sisti
College Secretary Stephanie Maguire

The Head of the College is an appointed position who must be reappointed every four years.

References

External links
 Rockefeller College website

Educational institutions established in 1982
Colleges of Princeton University
Institutions founded by the Rockefeller family
1982 establishments in New Jersey